Produced by Ashi Productions, the anime series  is the title of two different magical-girl anime. In this article, it is described first series' episodes list.

It premiered in Japan on TV Tokyo on March 18, 1982 where it ran for 63 episodes until its conclusion on May 26, 1983. The series separated two seasons. The first season include 48 episodes. The princess of fairyland is sent on a mission. The second season, she against Evil Shadow in the dream.

"You may do anything, as long as it is interesting." Magical Princess Minky Momo is created by this policy. This anime series has many type of a tale. For example, one episodes is a love romance, is a spy fiction, is a super robot anime.  Plus, episode 42 is a parody of the movie Dr. Strangelove.

See also
List of Minky Momo 1991 episodes

References

Lists of anime episodes

fr:Gigi (série télévisée d'animation)#Épisodes
ja:魔法のプリンセス ミンキーモモのエピソード一覧#『魔法のプリンセスミンキーモモ』（1982年）